Pseudhammus congolensis is a species of beetle in the family Cerambycidae. It was described by Hintz in 1913, originally under the genus Monohammus.

References

congolensis
Beetles described in 1913